Bower Featherstone was a Canadian civil servant who was convicted of espionage in 1966.

Featherstone was a lithographer who worked for the Department of Energy, Mines and Resources.

A promising young officer in the RCMP Security Service, Gilles G. Brunet, played a significant role in his conviction, work for which he won a promotion.
His handler was Eugen Kourianov.  According to Nigel West, Kourianov was suddenly recalled to the Soviet Union, suggesting a mole had tipped of the Soviets.
Decades later western intelligence learned that Brunet, the young officer who won promotion for his work in convicting Featherstone, had also been a mole.

The main document he was convicted of handing over to the Soviets was a confidential chart of two shipwrecks southeast of Newfoundland.  Although he was convicted of violating Canada's Official Secrets Act none of the documents he passed on was actually secret.
Featherstone was the first individual to be convicted under the Official Secrets Act since the trials that followed the defection of Igor Gouzenko in the late 1940s.

Featherstone received a 30-month sentence, and served 10 months—2 months in the maximum security Collin's Bay Penitentiary, and 8 months at a minimum security forestry camp—before he was paroled.

References

1940 births
20th-century Canadian civil servants
Canadian people convicted of spying for the Soviet Union
Living people